Adaridi AD 3 was a wooden aircraft designed by the Russian engineer Boris Adaridin, who lived in Finland. It was a high wing aircraft with a low-powered engine. In 1923, the Finnish Air Force ordered one Adaridi aircraft. The aircraft was not given any official designation code. The maiden flight was on April 17, 1924.

The German ace, Leutnant Emil Thuy (32 victories in World War I) described the aircraft as having mediocre flying qualities, and that the  engine was inadequate. The aircraft was never meant to become a military aircraft, it was merely an exercise in building an aircraft.

The aircraft was stationed at the fighter squadron at Utti air force base from the summer of 1924 until 1931. It was very rarely flown, as inexperienced pilots could not get the aircraft off the ground.

Operators
 
Finnish Air Force

Museum aircraft
The sole manufactured Adaridi is displayed at the Finnish Aviation Museum.

Specifications (Adaridi)

See also

References

Further reading

 
 

1920s Finnish experimental aircraft
AD 3
Single-engined tractor aircraft
High-wing aircraft